Kerrie Friend (born 2 October 1963) is an Australian model and TV presenter best known for co-hosting Wheel of Fortune and Perfect Match.

References

External links

Australian television presenters
Australian women television presenters
Australian female models
Living people
1963 births